Anant Viththal Keer (Devanagari: अनंत विठ्ठल कीर), known by his alias Dhananjay Keer (धनंजय कीर)(1913–1984) was an Indian biographer who profiled many high profile politicians and social activists. He had written biographies of Mahatma Jyotiba Phule, B.R Ambedkar, V.D Savarkar, Bal Gangadhar Tilak, Jyotiba Phule, Rajarshi Shahu Maharaj and Mahatma Gandhi.

Keer was born in Ratnagiri on 23 April 1913. His father's name was Vithal and his mother's was Devaki; he was married to Sudha and had six children. K. N. Jadhav writes that the revolutionary atmosphere in Ratnagiri in the early 1920s had a great influence on him. He migrated to Mumbai in 1938 to work with the Education Committee of the city's Municipal Corporation. He began writing in "Free Hindustan". His first biography, that of Savarkar, was first published in 1950. Later he wrote biographies of Ambedkar and Tilak. Resigning from his job, he wrote biographies of Phule, Shahu and Gandhi. He was bestowed with the Padma Bhushan in 1971 and was conferred with an honorary doctorate by the Shivaji University in 1980.

Keer had worked with Savarkar in the building of a temple in Ratnagiri.

Books

Marathi
 Mahatma Jotirao Phule: Amchya Samajkrantiche Janak
 Dr. Babasaheb Ambedkar (1966)
 Lokmanya Tilak ani Rajarshi Shahu Maharaj: Ek Mulyamapan (1971)
 Vishwabhooshan Dr. Babasaheb Ambedkar: Manas Ani Tattvavichar Mahatma Phule : Samagra Wangmay (1969) (Coeditor S. G. Malshe)
 Krushnarao Arjun Keluskar: Atmacharitya va Charitya Rajarshi Shahu Chattrapati Krutadnya Mi Krutartha Mi (autobiography)
 Lokhitkarte Babasaheb BoleTeen Mahan Saraswat (1979)
Hyani Itihas Ghadawila (1980)

English
 Veer Savarkar / Savarakar and His Times (1950) 
 Dr. Ambedkar: Life and Mission (1954)
 Lokmanya Tilak: Father of Indian Freedom Struggle (1959)
 Mahatma Jotirao Phule: Father of Indian Social Revolution (1964)
 Mahatma Gandhi: Political Saint and Unarmed Prophet (1973)
 Shahu Chattrapati: A Royal Revolutionary'' (1976)

References

1913 births
1984 deaths
Recipients of the Padma Bhushan in literature & education
Writers from Pune
Marathi people
20th-century Indian biographers